The Norfolk/Pitcairnese alphabet is a Latin alphabet. It is used to write Norfolk/Pitcairnese.

It contains 22 letters and 5 digraphs:

{|
|A||AA||B||C||D||E||EE||F||G||H||I||II||J||K||L||M||N||O||OO||P||R||S||T||U||UU||W||Y
|-
|a||aa||b||c||d||e||ee||f||g||h||i||ii||j||k||l||m||n||o||oo||p||r||s||t||u||uu||w||y
|}

Norfolk/Pitcairnese also uses the other digraphs and 1 trigraph below.

IE SH KS (SCH)

The letters "C" (meaning "K" or "S"("Ch" meaning "Sh")), "Q" (Meaning "K" and pronounced kiiuuw), "V", "X" (Meaning "KS" and pronounced eks or iks) and "Z" (Meaning "S" and pronounced sed) are not part of the Norfolk/Pitcairnese alphabet but are used in foreign loan words.

See also
 English alphabet

Latin alphabets
Norfuk language